Samuel "Sam" Roberts was an English rugby union footballer who played in the 1880s. He played at representative level for England, and at club level for Swinton, as a fullback, i.e. number 15. Roberts represented England in the years before Swinton changed football codes to rugby league.

Playing career

International honours
Sam Roberts won caps for England while at Swinton in 1887 against Wales, and Ireland.

References

External links
Statistics at espnscrum.com
Search for "Roberts" at rugbyleagueproject.org

England international rugby union players
English rugby union players
Rugby union fullbacks
Swinton Lions players
Year of birth missing
Year of death missing